The 2013–14 Alabama Crimson Tide men's basketball team (variously "Alabama", "UA", "Bama" or "The Tide") represented the University of Alabama in the 2013–14 college basketball season. The team's head coach was Anthony Grant, in his fifth season at Alabama after posting a 23–13 record in the 2012–13 season, when the Crimson Tide finished tied for second in the SEC and received a bid to the 2013 National Invitation Tournament. The team played their home games at Coleman Coliseum in Tuscaloosa, Alabama, as a member of the Southeastern Conference. This was the 101st season of basketball in the school's history.

Off-season

Departures
Just a week after completing the 2012–13 season, associate head coach Dan Hipsher was named head coach at the University of Texas-Pan American. Former Alabama player Antoine Pettway was promoted to assistant head coach, replacing Hipsher. Then, on April 9, starting center Moussa Gueye announced that he would be transferring from the program, ultimately landing at Valparaiso University. Two weeks later, former 5-star recruit Trevor Lacey announced he would also be transferring from Alabama. Lacey, the only player to start all 36 contests, later announced he would attend North Carolina State University, joining former Crimson Tide head coach Mark Gottfried. On June 4, freshman Devonta Pollard, also a former 5-star recruit, was charged as part of a kidnapping for which his mother was arrested the previous month. Pollard faces one count of conspiracy to commit kidnapping in the April 30 abduction of a child who was taken from her school in Scooba, Mississippi. It was later announced that Pollard was no longer a member of the Crimson Tide basketball team.

Arrivals
The Crimson Tide also added 2 transfers, 2 freshmen signees as well as a junior college transfer. Guard Ricky Tarrant, a two-time all-conference performer, transferred from Tulane University and will have to sit out the 2013-14 season per NCAA rules. The former Conference USA Freshman of the Year will have two years of eligibility remaining. Before transferring to Alabama, Michael Kessens, a 6-9, 215-pound power forward who played his freshman season at Longwood University. Kessens, a native of Nyon, Switzerland, will also have to sit out this year but will have three years of eligibility remaining.

Class of 2013 signees

Roster

Source: Rolltide.com 2013–14 Roster

Depth chart

Schedule and results

|-
!colspan=12 style="background:#990000; color:#FFFFFF;"|Exhibition

|-
!colspan=12 style="background:#990000; color:#FFFFFF;"| Non-conference regular season

|-
!colspan=12 style="background:#990000; color:#FFFFFF;"| SEC regular season

|-
!colspan=12 style="background:#990000; color:#FFFFFF;"|2014 SEC tournament

|-
| colspan="12" | *Non-conference game. Rankings from AP poll. All times are in Central Time. (#) is seed within tournament.
|}
Notes:
Game was originally scheduled for January 29, 2014, but was moved to January 30 due to snowy conditions across Alabama.

Source: 2013–14 Schedule. Rolltide.com

See also
Iron Bowl of Basketball
2013–14 NCAA Division I men's basketball season
2013–14 NCAA Division I men's basketball rankings
2013–14 Alabama Crimson Tide women's basketball team

References

Alabama
Alabama Crimson Tide men's basketball seasons
Alabama Crimson Tide
Alabama Crimson Tide